Chandigarh Group of Colleges, Jhanjeri also known as (CGC Jhanjeri) is an I. K. Gujral Punjab Technical University affiliated college group located in  Jhanjeri, near Chandigarh and Mohali. Even after sharing same brand name i.e. "Chandigarh Group of Colleges (CGC)" with CGC Landran and CGC Gharaun or Chandigarh University, the three colleges run under different administrations. CGC Jhanjeri was established in the year 2012 and run by Chandigarh Educational Society, Jhanjeri. Rashpal Singh Dhaliwal  serves as the President of the college. The college has been approved by the All India Council for Technical Education (AICTE) and respective managing bodies of Govt. of India. The former Australian PM Tony Abbott visited the CGC Jhanjeri campus and met the college President. The college group is linked with many international educational bodies like AIESEC, University of Tasmania, European Association of Folklore festivals and many more.

Courses 
It provides undergraduate and postgraduate programs in the fields of Engineering, Management, Commerce, Computer Application, Journalism and Sciences. In 2021, the college is going to start new courses in the fields of Law, Pharmacy, and Liberal Arts and Humanities. During third Convocation held at the campus in the presence of the education Minister of Punjab, Gurmeet Singh Meet Hayer, 1,307 degrees conferred to students and 96 students were honored with medals.

Rashpal Singh Dhaliwal 

Rashpal Singh Dhaliwal is the founder of Chandigarh Group of Colleges Jhanjeri, and Landran. In 2000, he co-founded CGC Landran with Satnam Singh Sandhu. Later in 2012, he founded CGC Jhanjeri. In July, 2021, He founded Chandigarh Law College at CGC Jhanjeri. He holds the position of president at both the campuses of CGC. In 2010, He along with Satnam Singh Sandhu, the chairman at CGC gave open platform by accompanying Punjab Infotech to both students and faculty to computerize government offices including jails at Punjab. In 2012, he launched "earn while you learn program" at CGC Jhanjeri to facilitate and motivate college students.  He is also member at Punjab unaided technical Institutions Association (PUTIA). In December 2021, Dhaliwal won ET Inspiring North-Chandigarh Leader's Awards by Times Internet for being exceptional educationist.

Accolades 
 CGC Jhanjeri was awarded with "Best Placements Award" during National Education Excellence Awards 2016.           
 In 2017, CGC Jhanjeri was in top three institutes selected for the post development activities of Smart India Hackathon 2017 (ceremony organized by Ministry of Education (India)).           
CGC Jhanjeri was also awarded with Best Educational Institute in Punjab by Brand Icon which was presented by Shilpa Shetty.           
 In 2018, CGC Jhanjeri has been awarded with Best Placements Award in Punjab from Amarinder Singh, the Chief Minister of Punjab (India).           
 In December 2019, the college was given the accolade as the most innovative group of colleges in North India during Iconic Education Summit & Awards.
 CGC Technical Campus received Aspiring Mind's National Employ-ability Award in 2020.
 In Dec 2021, CGC Jhanjeri bagged the Fastest growing educational group in North India award in Iconic Summit & Awards by Top gallant Media,
 In the same month and Year, CGC Jhanjeri won the Award For Excellence in Agriculture Education.
 In January 2022, IIC, Ministry of Education's Innovation Cell (Government Of India) rated CGC Jhanjeri 3.5 out of 4. 
 CGC Jhanjeri topped the outlook list of the engineering colleges for placement opportunities..
 Silicon India ranked CGC Jhanjeri at 4th position among Top Group Of Colleges in India – 2021..
 Times B School Survey Ranked CGC Jhanjeri 41st Management Institutes in Pan India, 15th in Regional Ranking in North Zone and last but not the least, Ranked 27th Among Top 100 Private Institutes.
 Business World Education Portal listed Chandigarh School of Business of CGC Jhanjeri at number 1 position among Top 10 Management Colleges For The Best Business Education.

Social responsibility 

 In 2018, the college group spread the awareness to empower India through a flashmob performed by 200 students in Sukhna Lake
CGC Jhanjeri in collaboration with Fortis Healthcare organized a talk show to spread COVID-19 pandemic awareness among the nearby village and rural residents and distributed Sanitizers and food essentials to them.
In 2020 during Covid, CGC Jhanjeri launched Covid scholarships worth ₹2 Crores to counter coronavirus financial crises to the needy students.
In 2021, the college launched the CGC Jhanjeri Open Scholarship for Higher Education (JOSH) offering scholarship up to 5 crores to counter second wave of coronavirus financial crises especially in states like Uttarakhand and Jammu and Kashmir (union territory).

References 

Engineering colleges in Chandigarh
Engineering colleges in Punjab, India
Educational institutions established in 2012
2012 establishments in Punjab, India
Universities and colleges in Punjab, India
All India Council for Technical Education
Business schools in Punjab, India